Bassaniana floridana is a species of spider in the genus Bassaniana found in the U.S.

Description
Anterior eye row slightly recurved. Anterior legs of the male are slightly mottled.

References

Thomisidae
Spiders of the United States
Spiders described in 1896